Boogie Beebies is a United Kingdom children's television programme, which was produced and broadcast by the BBC. It aired on CBeebies (both the separate channel and CBeebies on BBC One and BBC Two). The show first aired on 27 September 2004, and won the Best Pre School Live Action award, at the BAFTA Children's Awards in 2005.

Every programme is 15 minutes long, and teaches children a dance (to a short original soundtrack), a different one every week. It was originally presented by Nataylia "Nat" Roni and Pete Hillier. Nataylia had previously played the role of 'Nala' in the West End with Disney in The Lion King. However, from November 2006, it was presented by Pete alone along with a new group of children called 'The Boogie Bunch' who could be the co presenters since Nat was absent. In the same series, Pete was given a nickname, 'Boogie Pete'.  It also features clips of children (at home, in schools or in front of bluescreen).

In earlier series, the same programme was shown throughout the week. In the later series, a slightly different programme was shown daily. The only variant being, the verses of the soundtrack are taught, and the chorus is only run through once.

The dance is taught segment by segment by the presenters. In earlier programmes, the two presenters took turns with every segment. The moves to every day's dance, as well as the theme of the soundtrack, are drawn from either nature or the world around us (such as "The Ocean Motion", featuring dance moves inspired by various sea creatures). Every time, the program culminates with a full performance of the soundtrack and dance, known as "The Big Video", in which the presenters call "Big Video Time".

In Series 1, one presenter would be on a green screen set of yellow and green polka dots, and the other presenter would go somewhere wherever fits the song, for example, Pete might go to a construction site for the Dig It song. Or Nat could go to a flower garden for the Gardening song. However, in Series 2, Pete would usually stand in front of a green screen to the place, rather than going there. And the Boogie Bunch will too for a short dance tutorial. And he would also stand in front of the typical green and yellow polka dot set, but in this season, they move into the opposite colours and that repeats.

In Series 1, Nat would wear a pink sleeveless jacket, and Pete would wear a green t-shirt with yellow stripes and neck. In Series 2, Pete's outfit varies, between a red t-shirt with a yellow fire symbol, and a green t-shirt with a yellow firework symbol.

The name of the programme comes from the informal verb to dance (boogie) and the Beebies suffix of CBeebies. The program was advertised using a child dancing "Travolta style" to A Fifth of Beethoven by Walter Murphy.

In 2020, it was revealed that the series would be making a comeback to CBeebies, with Oti Mabuse hosting.

Episodes 

Series 1

Presented by Nat Roni and Pete Hillier,
 
Dig It
Gardening
Go Go Mango
Hey Monkey
Ocean Motion
Space Walking 
Turning Around
Bug-a-Lug
Carousel
Building
Penguin Bop
Do the Duck 
Shoe Hoedown
Going to the Park
Football Shimmy
Pirate Gang 
Cup Cake
Teatime
Double Decker
Dream Cleaning Crew
Dancing on the Sand
Butterfly Fly!
Chuffa Chuffa Chawoowooo
Take it to the Checkout
The Kangaroo
Tick Tock Clock
Little Dreamer
Barnyard Boogie
Every Kind of Weather
We Want to Be Fit

Series 2
Presented by Pete Hillier
Rainbow Sky
Airport 
Vegetable Jam
I Wish it Would Snow
Brave Prince
Roll Up, Roll Up 
Do the Dino
Orchestra
Baby Boogie
Woof! Woof!
In the Swim
Viking Warrior
Tractor Stomp
I Want to Be...
Sporty Boogie
Waterhole

Series 3

Presented by Oti Mabuse titled as Oti's Boogie Beebies

Zoom to the Moon Song
Get Dancing Song
Shine Like the Sun Song
Sea Creatures Song: 4 June 2020
Feeling Good Song: Can't Stop the Feeling! by Justin Timberlake 5 June 2020
Full Steam Ahead Song: 8 June 2020
All Things Red Song: Ruby by Kaiser Chiefs 9 June 2020
Sport Star Song: Eat My Goal by Collapsed Lung 10 June 2020
Favourite Place Song: Rather Be by Clean Bandit feat. Jess Glynne 11 June 2020
Jungle Song: 12 June 2020
Up, Down and Around Song: Keep On Movin' by Five 15 June 2020
Upside Down Song: Upside Down by Paloma Faith 16 June 2020
Musical Instrument Jam Song: 17 June 2020
Monsters Song: Monster Mash by Bobby "Boris" Pickett & the Crypt-Kickers 18 June 2020
Fruit and Vegetables Song: I Really Like You by Carly Rae Jepsen 19 June 2020

Home Media
BBC Worldwide released several DVDs of the series in the United Kingdom.

References

External links
 

CBeebies - Boogie Beebies at bbc.co.uk
Grown Up Information for Boogie Beebies at the BBC, including Location details
Review at Bad TV Redeemed
BBC Press Release 2005
BBC DVD Release 2006

2004 British television series debuts
2006 British television series endings
2000s British children's television series
British preschool education television series
BBC children's television shows
CBeebies
English-language television shows
Television series by BBC Studios
British television series revived after cancellation